Mirko Hrgović (born 5 February 1979) is a Bosnian football coach and former player. He serves as an assistant coach at HNK Šibenik. Hrgović most notably played for Croatian rivals Hajduk Split and Dinamo Zagreb as well as VfL Wolfsburg of German Bundesliga among others.

Club career

NK Široki Brijeg
Hrgović, who is an ethnic Croatian, decided to play for Bosnia and Herzegovina after his games went unnoticed in Croatia. Hrgović decided to take Bosnia and Herzegovina nationality while playing for the Bosnian-Herzegovinian club NK Široki Brijeg and take up the call by Blaž Slišković. Hrgović has played for NK Posušje and NK Široki Brijeg in the Premier League of Bosnia and Herzegovina, Gamba Osaka and JEF United Chiba in J1 League, VfL Wolfsburg in German Bundesliga, Hajduk Split, Dinamo Zagreb in 1.HNL.

NK Dinamo Zagreb
On 18 July 2008, Hrgović signed a three-year contract. His move, albeit not directly from Hajduk to Dinamo, has stirred quite a controversy among both Hajduk and Dinamo fans. While Hajduk fans tend to see the move as a treason to their beloved club, Dinamo fans cannot forgive the physical altercation between Hrgović and a couple of them that occurred seven months earlier during the national futsal competition. Graffiti against Hrgović and death threats (including a puppet of him being hanged by the Dinamo stadium fence) have been registered.

Greuther Fürth
On 17 July 2009, he signed a two-year contract with SpVgg Greuther Fürth and was released on 25 November 2009.

NK Široki Brijeg
After his release in November 2009 by SpVgg Greuther Fürth, Hrgović signed in March 2010 a contract with his former club NK Široki Brijeg.

International career

He made his debut for Bosnia and Herzegovina in a February 2003 friendly match away against Wales and has earned a total of 29 caps, scoring 2 goals. He played as a standard player during Blaž Slišković's reign as national coach. After Slišković's resignation in 2006, he played under new coach Fuad Muzurović and later on for Meho Kodro. When Miroslav Blažević became coach, he was dropped for several games because he was not playing well for his club. His move to Greuther Fürth proved to be a good one as he was called back to represent Bosnia in the last World Cup 2010 qualifiers against Estonia and Spain. His final international was an October 2009 FIFA World Cup qualification match against Spain.

Career statistics

Club

National team

International goals
Scores and results list Bosnia and Herzegovina's goal tally first:

References

External links

1979 births
Living people
People from Sinj
Croats of Bosnia and Herzegovina
Association football midfielders
Bosnia and Herzegovina footballers
Bosnia and Herzegovina international footballers
NK Junak Sinj players
HNK Hajduk Split players
HŠK Posušje players
Gamba Osaka players
NK Široki Brijeg players
VfL Wolfsburg players
JEF United Chiba players
GNK Dinamo Zagreb players
SpVgg Greuther Fürth players
Kavala F.C. players
RNK Split players
NK Zadar players
First Football League (Croatia) players
Croatian Football League players
J1 League players
Premier League of Bosnia and Herzegovina players
Bundesliga players
2. Bundesliga players
Super League Greece players
Bosnia and Herzegovina expatriate footballers
Expatriate footballers in Germany
Bosnia and Herzegovina expatriate sportspeople in Germany
Expatriate footballers in Japan
Bosnia and Herzegovina expatriate sportspeople in Japan
Expatriate footballers in Greece
Bosnia and Herzegovina expatriate sportspeople in Greece